Ibn al-Jarrāḥ may refer to:

Abu Ubayda ibn al-Jarrah (583–639), Muslim commander and companion of Muhammad
Waki' ibn al-Jarrah (745/47–812), hadith scholar
Ali ibn Isa ibn al-Jarrah (859–946), Persian official of the Abbasid Caliphate
Mufarrij ibn Daghfal ibn al-Jarrah (fl. c. 977–1013), Jarrahid emir and rebel against the Fatimid Caliphate